Mehmet Çetingöz (born May 12, 1991, in Şanlıurfa, Turkey) is a Turkish wheelchair basketball player in center position. He is a 4 point player competing for Beşiktaş JK wheelchair basketball team. He is part of the Turkey men's junior national wheelchair basketball team and captain of the U23 team.

Çetingöz became paralyzed at his right leg as a result of polio he contracted when he was four years of age. He began with wheelchair basketball with fourteen in a disabled sports club in Şanlıurfa.

After playing eight years for Şanlıurfa Wheelchair, he was transferred in August 2013 to Beşiktaş JK, which  competes in the Turkish Wheelchair Basketball Super League.

Çetingöz became champion with the national junior team at the 5th Fazza International Wheelchair Basketball Championships held on April 17–23, 2013 in Dubai and was named Top Scorer.

Awards

Individual
 5th Fazza International Wheelchair Basketball Championships - "Top Scorer"

National team
 5th Fazza International Wheelchair Basketball Championships -  with national junior team

References

1991 births
Sportspeople from Şanlıurfa
Living people
Turkish men's wheelchair basketball players
Beşiktaş JK wheelchair basketball players
People with polio
Centers (basketball)